The 2017 CAF Confederation Cup (officially the 2017 Total CAF Confederation Cup for sponsorship reasons) was the 14th edition of the CAF Confederation Cup, Africa's secondary club football competition organized by the Confederation of African Football (CAF).

Starting from this season, the group stage was expanded from eight to 16 teams, divided into four groups of four, and the knockout stage expanded from 4 to 8 teams.

Defending champions TP Mazembe, which entered the Confederation Cup after losing in the 2017 CAF Champions League first round, defeated Supersport United in the final, and earned the right to play against the winners of the 2017 CAF Champions League in the 2018 CAF Super Cup.

Association team allocation
All 56 CAF member associations may enter the CAF Confederation Cup, with the 12 highest ranked associations according to their CAF 5-Year Ranking eligible to enter two teams in the competition. As a result, theoretically a maximum of 68 teams could enter the tournament (plus 16 teams eliminated from the CAF Champions League which enter the play-off round) – although this level has never been reached.

For the 2017 CAF Confederation Cup, the CAF uses the 2011–2015 CAF 5-Year Ranking, which calculates points for each entrant association based on their clubs’ performance over those 5 years in the CAF Champions League and CAF Confederation Cup. The criteria for points are the following:

The points are multiplied by a coefficient according to the year as follows:
2015 – 5
2014 – 4
2013 – 3
2012 – 2
2011 – 1

Teams
The following 52 teams from 40 associations entered the competition.
Teams in bold received a bye to the first round.
The other teams entered the preliminary round.

Associations are shown according to their 2011–2015 CAF 5-Year Ranking – those with a ranking score have their rank and score indicated.

A further 16 teams eliminated from the 2017 CAF Champions League enter the play-off round.

Associations which did not enter a team

 Benin
 Cape Verde
 Central African Republic
 Chad
 Djibouti
 Eritrea
 Gambia
 Guinea-Bissau
 Lesotho
 Malawi
 Mauritania
 Namibia
 Réunion
 São Tomé and Príncipe
 Somalia
 Togo

Notably one team takes part in the competition that does not currently play in their national top-division. They are MAS Fez (2nd tier).

Schedule
The schedule of the competition was as follows (matches scheduled in midweek in italics).

The calendar was amended from the original one for the following dates:
Quarter-finals first leg: moved from 8–10 September to 15–17 September
Quarter-finals second leg: moved from 15–17 September to 22–24 September
Semi-finals second leg: moved from 13–15 October to 20–22 October

Qualifying rounds

Preliminary round

First round

Play-off round

Group stage

Group A

Group B

Group C

Group D

Knockout stage

Bracket

Quarter-finals

Semi-finals

Final

Top goalscorers

See also
2017 CAF Champions League
2018 CAF Super Cup

References

External links
Total Confederation Cup 2017, CAFonline.com

 
2017
2